"Einstein vs. Stephen Hawking" is a song and music video, performed by Zach "MC Mr. Napkins" Sherwin, Peter "NicePeter" Shukoff, and Lloyd "EpicLLOYD" Ahlquist.  It is the 7th episode of the 1st season of the YouTube video series Epic Rap Battles of History. The video was released on March 30, 2011 on Shukoff's YouTube channel.

Music video
The video features 20th-century German-American theoretical physicist Albert Einstein (portrayed by MC Mr. Napkins) and English theoretical physicist Stephen Hawking (portrayed by NicePeter) facing off in a rap battle. American astronomer Carl Sagan (portrayed by EpicLLOYD) makes a brief cameo appearance.

As of December 2022, the video has received over 132 million views on YouTube.

Certifications
On November 20, 2013, the song was certified Gold by the RIAA. ERB had become the first YouTube channel to do so with the certification of "Barack Obama vs. Mitt Romney" (S2 E08) as Gold in July 2013.

References

External links
Original ERB music video on YouTube

2011 songs
Cultural depictions of Albert Einstein
Cultural depictions of Stephen Hawking
Epic Rap Battles of History
Maker Studios videos
Parodies
Songs about science
Songs about scientists
2011 YouTube videos